The Treaty of Paris (1857) marked the end of the hostilities of the Anglo-Persian War. On the Persian side negotiations were handled by ambassador Ferukh Khan. The two sides signed the peace treaty on 4 March 1857.

In the Treaty, the Persians agreed to withdraw from Herat, to apologise to the British ambassador on his return, and to sign a commercial treaty; the British agreed not to shelter opponents of the Shah in the embassy, and they abandoned the demand to replace prime minister as well as one requiring territorial concessions to the Imam of Muscat, a British ally.

See also
 Greater Iran
 Franco-Persian alliance
 British Occupation of Bushehr

Notes

1857 in Iran
1857 treaties
1857 in France
1857 in the United Kingdom
1850s in Paris
Iran–United Kingdom relations
Peace treaties of the United Kingdom
Treaties of the Qajar dynasty
Treaties of the United Kingdom (1801–1922)
Anglo-Persian War